RSBI may refer to:
 Radiographic supporting bone index
 Rapid shallow breathing index